Ha Tae-kyun (born 2 November 1987) is a South Korean Football player who currently plays for Jeonnam Dragons. He was chosen as the number one draft pick for Suwon in 2007. Ha  has also been nominated for the 2007 K-League Rookie of the Year Award.

Club career
After becoming the Top Goal Scorer in the "Geumgang-Daegi Korean High School Competition" with 6 goals in total, Ha was chosen by K-League giant Suwon Samsung Bluewings in the draft. In his debut season for Suwon, Ha scored the winning goal against Suwon's biggest rival FC Seoul on 8 April 2007, in a match that recorded the highest ever attendance (55,397) in K-League play. Having recorded 5 goals and 1 assist in 18 games in his debut season, Ha was nominated for the 2007 K-League Rookie of the Year Award.

On 19 February 2015, Ha was loaned to China League One side Yanbian Changbaishan until 20 July 2015.  He made a permanent transfer to Yanbianin in July 2015.
In February 2017, Ha transferred to League One side Baoding Yingli Yitong.

International career
He participated in the 2007 FIFA U-20 World Cup with the South Korea national football team.
Ha has made appearances for the South Korea national under-23 football team during the qualification for the 2008 Beijing Men's Football Olympics.

Club career statistics
Statistics accurate as of match played 28 October 2017.

Honours

Club
Suwon Samsung Bluewings
 K League 1: 2008
 Korean FA Cup: 2009, 2010
 Korean League Cup: 2008
 Pan-Pacific Championship: 2009

Sangju Sangmu
 K League 2: 2013

Yanbian Changbaishan
 China League One: 2015

Individual
 K-League Rookie of The Year: 2007
 China League One Most Valuable Player: 2015
 China League One Top Scorer: 2015

External links

References

1987 births
Living people
Association football forwards
South Korean footballers
South Korea international footballers
Suwon Samsung Bluewings players
Gimcheon Sangmu FC players
Yanbian Funde F.C. players
Baoding Yingli Yitong players
Jeonnam Dragons players
K League 1 players
K League 2 players
Chinese Super League players
China League One players
Expatriate footballers in China
South Korean expatriate sportspeople in China
Sportspeople from South Gyeongsang Province
Dankook University alumni